This is a list of African-American newspapers that have been published in the state of Nevada.  Nevada was "the last state to remove itself from the list of states that have never had a Black newspaper" in the mid-20th century.

While the late 19th century saw a flourishing African American press in many other Western states and territories, Nevada's African-American population at the time was very low, falling as low as 134 in 1900.  As a result, during that early period, "no Negro-owned newspaper, even of the most ephemeral kind, was published in Nevada."

Newspapers 

To be included in this list, a periodical should be mentioned in a reliable source as an African-American newspaper published in Nevada.

Other publications

See also 
List of African-American newspapers and media outlets
List of African-American newspapers in Arizona
List of African-American newspapers in California
List of African-American newspapers in Oregon
List of African-American newspapers in Utah
List of newspapers in Nevada
List of African-American newspapers in Washington (state)
List of African-American newspapers in New Mexico
List of African-American newspapers in Georgia
List of African-American newspapers in Louisiana
List of African-American newspapers in New York
List of African-American newspapers in Texas
List of Gypsy American newspapers in Nevada
List of Mexican American newspapers in Nevada

Works cited

References 

Newspapers
Nevada
African-American
African-American newspapers